Euryanthe (minor planet designation: 527 Euryanthe) is a minor planet orbiting the Sun.  It was discovered in 1904 by Max Wolf and named after the heroine of the opera Euryanthe by the German composer Carl Maria von Weber.

References

External links
 
 

Background asteroids
Euryanthe
Euryanthe
Cb-type asteroids (SMASS)
19040320